Deathprod is a box set by ambient noise artist Deathprod. It contains four discs, three of which are Deathprod's earlier albums with the first disc containing previously-unreleased and rare material.

Track listing

References

2004 compilation albums
Rune Grammofon compilation albums